RTP Internacional (RTPi) is a Portuguese free-to-air television channel owned and operated by state-owned public broadcaster Rádio e Televisão de Portugal (RTP). It is the company's international television service, and is known for broadcasting a mix of programming from other RTP's channels, together with special Contacto programmes aimed at Portuguese communities in Europe, Africa, the Americas, as well as Macao and East Timor.

History

It first started broadcasting via satellite in Europe on 10 June 1992 (Portugal Day). It soon expanded into Africa, where it reached audiences in Portuguese-speaking countries, as well as Canada, United States, Brazil and into Asia. It is also available on the Internet, via a subscription to the service JumpTV or with Octoshape.

On 7 January 1998, RTPi ceased terrestrial broadcasting to Portuguese-speaking countries in Africa, and was replaced by a new separate service, called RTP África, which was available as a terrestrial TV service in some countries, as well as being available via satellite, but RTPi continues to broadcast in Angola and Mozambique. RTPi is carried by satellite television services across Africa in various countries such as South Africa, Namibia and Zimbabwe.

RTPi programming is also retransmitted by Teledifusão de Macau (TdM) in Macao, and by Televisão Timor Leste (TVTL) in East Timor, together with local broadcasts. In March 2005 it began 'time-shifting' its programming, with three separate schedules for the Americas, Europe, and Asia, so that viewers in different time zones could watch programmes at more convenient times.

In 2017, the TV and radio service – RTP Internacional and RDP, respectively – of RTP, as well as the Portuguese news agency Lusa, were suspended from operating in Guinea-Bissau. The measure was announced by Bissau-Guinean minister for the media, Vítor Pereira. He justified the decision with end of the contracts with RTP and Lusa. The Portuguese government considered the decision to be "unacceptable" and an "attack on freedom of expression, while Reporters Without Borders condemned that same decision. Lusa was eventually allowed to operate in the country, but RTP Internacional and RDP were not.

Distribution
RTP Internacional is available across all of North America for free via Galaxy 19 and Intelsat 805. It is also available as a pay service via Dish Network in the United States and Rogers Cable and NexTV (IPTV Platform) in Canada.

For years, the channel was carried in Australia and New Zealand via UBI World TV. In 2013, RTP Internacional returned to these countries via Luso Vision, which focuses on Portuguese, Brazilian and Chilean programming.

References

External links
 
RTP Internacional Live Stream on RTP Play

Cable television in the United States
International broadcasters
Television channels in Angola
Television channels in Mozambique
Television stations in China
Television stations in Spain
Television stations in East Timor
Television stations in Portugal
Portuguese-language television stations
Mass media in Macau
Television channels and stations established in 1992
Rádio e Televisão de Portugal